Plymouth is a city in Cerro Gordo County, Iowa, United States, along the Shell Rock River. The population was 375 at the time of the 2020 census. It is part of the Mason City Micropolitan Statistical Area.

Geography
Plymouth is located at  (43.245346, -93.122575).

Demographics

2010 census
As of the census of 2010, there were 382 people, 164 households, and 111 families residing in the city. The racial makeup of the city was 97.4% White, 0.5% African American, 0.3% Native American, 0.3% Asian, 0.3% Pacific Islander, and 1.3% from two or more races. Hispanic or Latino of any race were 2.4% of the population.

There were 164 households, of which 25.0% had children under the age of 18 living with them, 57.9% were married couples living together, 6.1% had a female householder with no husband present, 3.7% had a male householder with no wife present, and 32.3% were non-families. 27.4% of all households were made up of individuals, and 7.3% had someone living alone who was 65 years of age or older. The average household size was 2.33 and the average family size was 2.79.

The median age in the city was 45.4 years. 18.8% of residents were under the age of 18; 9.8% were between the ages of 18 and 24; 20.7% were from 25 to 44; 36.5% were from 45 to 64; and 14.4% were 65 years of age or older. The gender makeup of the city was 52.4% male and 47.6% female.

2000 census
As of the census of 2000, there were 429 people, 164 households, and 120 families residing in the city. The racial makeup of the city was 98.83% White, 0.70% Native American, and 0.47% from two or more races. Hispanic or Latino of any race were 1.17% of the population.

There were 164 households, out of which 35.4% had children under the age of 18 living with them, 63.4% were married couples living together, 7.9% had a female householder with no husband present, and 26.8% were non-families. 22.0% of all households were made up of individuals, and 11.6% had someone living alone who was 65 years of age or older. The average household size was 2.62 and the average family size was 3.08.

In the city, the population was spread out, with 28.7% under the age of 18, 5.4% from 18 to 24, 27.5% from 25 to 44, 23.1% from 45 to 64, and 15.4% who were 65 years of age or older. The median age was 39 years. For every 100 females, there were 105.3 males. For every 100 females age 18 and over, there were 102.6 males.

The median income for a household in the city was $32,344, and the median income for a family was $40,179. Males had a median income of $31,042 versus $20,250 for females. The per capita income for the city was $12,888. About 4.1% of families and 6.3% of the population were below the poverty line, including 3.5% of those under age 18 and 6.3% of those age 65 or over.

Education
Plymouth's public schools are operated by the Central Springs Community School District, established on July 1, 2011, by the merger of North Central Community School District and Nora Springs–Rock Falls Community School District. Prior to the merger, it was in the North Central district.

References

Cities in Cerro Gordo County, Iowa
Cities in Iowa
Mason City, Iowa micropolitan area